

Deathbomb Arc is an independent record label based in Philadelphia, Pennsylvania, USA. It was started in 1998 by Brian Miller in Los Angeles, California, originally to release music by the band Turbine. Miller's cat Leroy Brown was the label's acting CEO until his death in 2014.

Miller has described the label's ethos as a "fuck you" attitude towards a music industry that is afraid of new ideas" and as "a window into another universe... for those of us with an ear to new sounds, we're already in that other universe, but I want to reach people who normally have to wait years before an "experimental" act is deemed normal enough for them." He characterises Deathbomb Arc as an "artist label" as well as a record label, treating record releases as just one part of an artistic spectrum. As an example, he cites clipping. as a Deathbomb Arc act, despite the group self-releasing their first album. According to clipping.'s William Hutson, "The modus operandi of Deathbomb is punk as a way of being in the world, and not a type of music."

Their website explains that "our criteria for putting out bands is inexplicable" and not constrained by genres. The label has released a wide range of styles including breakcore, noise rock, witch house, new age, hip hop, ambient, punk and techno. Notable releases include the first material from Clipping, JPEGMAFIA, Death Grips and Julia Holter.

Deathbomb Arc ran a digital singles club in 2011 and 2012, releasing a single each week by a wide variety of artists.

Artists released

Abe Vigoda
AIDS Wolf
Alphabets
ANGRY BLACKMEN
Back to the Future the Ride
Black Pus
Books on Tape
Captain Ahab
Child Pornography
clipping.
The Dead Science
Death Grips
DEBBY FRIDAY
Dos Monos
Divorce
Drug the Corpse
Fairhorns
Foot Village
Gang Wizard
Girl Pusher
GRYPT
I.E.
J. Fisher
JPEGMAFIA
Julia Holter
Kevin Blechdom
Lana Del Rabies
Mad Murderz
No Restraint
Obsidian Pond
Pariah Qarey
Patrick Wensink
Puppy Dog
R. Stevie Moore
Rose for Bohdan
rRope
SARN
SHADI
Signor Benedick the Moor
They Hate Change
Thurston Moore
tik///tik
Trash Dog
True Neutral Crew
Turbine
Viper Venom
Yellow Swans
Yola Fatoush
Yuma Nora
Xiu Xiu

References

External links
 Official Website
 Bandcamp page
 Twitter

American record labels
Record labels established in 1998